The Scheinberg is a hill, and the highest point in the Steigerwald, a hill range in southern Germany. It lies northeast of Ippesheim in the county of Neustadt an der Aisch-Bad Windsheim in Middle Franconia. To the north runs the border with the Lower Franconian province of Kitzingen.

References 

Hills of Bavaria